is a Japanese anime producer and president of Bones.

Career
A graduate of the Osaka University of Arts's department of arts, Minami began his career with noted anime studio Sunrise as one of its producers. Later, in 1998, he co-founded Bones together with animators Hiroshi Osaka and Toshihiro Kawamoto.

He was classmates in university with Gainax co-founder Hiroyuki Yamaga and manga artist Kazuhiko Shimamoto. He is portrayed by actor Kaname Endo in the 2014 television drama Aoi Honō based on Shimamoto's autobiographical manga.

Works
City Hunter 2
Musha Kishi Commando: SD Gundam Kinkyū Shutsugeki
SD Command Senki
SD Sengokuden: Tenka Taiha-hen
Shippu! Iron Leaguer
Mobile Fighter G Gundam
Vision of Escaflowne*
Welcome to Pia Carrot!! Gekijōban ~Sayaka no Koi Monogatari~
RahXephon: Tagen Hensōkyoku
Fullmetal Alchemist
Tenpō Ibun Ayakashi Ayashi
Sword of the Stranger
Heroman
Cowboy Bebop
Space Dandy
Wolf's Rain

References

External links
 
 Japan Movie Database
 Allcinema

1961 births
Sunrise (company) people
Japanese production designers
Japanese film producers
Japanese animated film producers
Japanese television producers
Living people
Osaka University of Arts alumni
People from Mie Prefecture
Crunchyroll Anime Awards winners